Alfred L. Werker (December 2, 1896 – July 28, 1975) was a film director whose work in movies spanned from 1917 through 1957.  After a number of film production jobs and assistant directing, Werker co-directed his first film, Ridin' the Wind in 1925 alongside director Del Andrews. He was brought in by Fox Film Corporation executives to re-shoot and re-edit Erich von Stroheim's film Hello, Sister! (1933), co-starring Boots Mallory and ZaSu Pitts.

Most of Werker's work is unremarkable, but a few were well received by critics.  Those films included House of Rothschild (1934) and The Adventures of Sherlock Holmes (1939); the latter film is considered one of the best in the Sherlock Holmes series.

During the early 1940s, he directed a number of comedies including Laurel & Hardy's A-Haunting We Will Go (1942).

In the late 1940s, Werker worked for the B-picture film studio Eagle-Lion Films.  Notable films from that period include the unique mystery thriller Repeat Performance (1947) and He Walked by Night (1948). The latter film, however, was taken over by uncredited director Anthony Mann. In 1949 He Walked by Night  won the Locarno International Film Festival's award for Best Police Film. The following year, Werker was nominated for, but did not win, the Directors Guild of America Outstanding Directorial Achievement in Motion Pictures for Lost Boundaries (1949).

Filmography

References

Sources

External links

1896 births
1975 deaths
People from Deadwood, South Dakota
Film directors from South Dakota
Cannes Film Festival Award for Best Screenplay winners